Ma Wen-chun (born 1 December 1965) is a Taiwanese politician. A member of the Kuomintang, she has served in the Legislative Yuan since 2009

Education
Ma received her bachelor's degree in pharmacy from Chia Nan University of Pharmacy and Science and master's degree in management development from Feng Chia University.

References

Living people
Kuomintang Members of the Legislative Yuan in Taiwan
1965 births
Members of the 7th Legislative Yuan
Members of the 8th Legislative Yuan
Members of the 9th Legislative Yuan
Nantou County Members of the Legislative Yuan
21st-century Taiwanese women politicians
Feng Chia University alumni
Members of the 10th Legislative Yuan